Harold Matthew "Hal" Barrett (September 4, 1935 – December 4, 2018) is a former marine insurance executive and politician in Newfoundland. He represented St. John's West in the Newfoundland House of Assembly from 1979 to 1989.

He was born in St. John's, Newfoundland and Labrador.

He was elected to the Newfoundland assembly in 1979, defeating Liberal Hubert Kitchen. Barrett was reelected in 1982 and 1985. He ran unsuccessfully for the Progressive Conservative party leadership in 1989. Barrett served in the provincial cabinet as Minister of Development and Tourism and as Minister of Finance. He was defeated when he ran for reelection in 1989, losing to Rex Gibbons. He was named chair of the Newfoundland Dockyards later that same year.

References 

1935 births
Living people
Members of the Executive Council of Newfoundland and Labrador
Politicians from St. John's, Newfoundland and Labrador
Progressive Conservative Party of Newfoundland and Labrador MHAs